Loyal Bros 2 (officially titled Only the Family – Lil Durk Presents: Loyal Bros 2) is a collaborative compilation album by American record label Only the Family and American rapper Lil Durk. It was released through the label alongside Empire Distribution on December 16, 2022. The album contains guest appearances from Future, Doodie Lo, Kodak Black, OTF Boonie Moe, THF Lil Law, THF Omerta, Booka600, late rapper King Von, Deeski, Lil Zay Osama, Chief Nuk, PGF Nuk, THF Zoo, Big30, Icewear Vezzo, OTF Jam, OTF Chugg, Noza Jordan, Esparo, C3, Trippie Redd, and Hypno Carlito. It serves as a sequel to Only the Family's compilation album, Loyal Bros (2021).

Singles and promotion
The lead single of the album, "ISTG, Pt. 2", which was performed by American rapper Doodie Lo and features fellow American rapper Kodak Black, was released on December 2, 2022. The second and final single, "Hanging with Wolves", which was performed by Lil Durk himself was released exactly one week later on December 9, 2022. The same day as its release, Durk announced the album alongside its title, release date, cover art, and a pre-order link. Five days later, on December 14, 2022, he revealed the tracklist.

Track listing

Charts

References

2022 compilation albums
Lil Durk albums